Bulkeley is a civil parish in Cheshire East, England. It contains five buildings that are recorded in the National Heritage List for England as designated listed buildings.  Of these, one is listed at Grade II*, the middle grade, and the others are at Grade II.  Apart from the village of Bulkeley and the settlement of Bulkelehay, the parish is rural.  The listed buildings consist of two country houses, farm buildings, a cottage, and a church.

Key

Buildings

See also
Listed buildings in Peckforton
Listed buildings in Ridley
Listed buildings in Cholmondeley
Listed buildings in Egerton
Listed buildings in Bickerton
Listed buildings in Burwardsley

References
Citations

Sources

 

Listed buildings in the Borough of Cheshire East
Lists of listed buildings in Cheshire